The Sultanate or Kingdom of Bagirmi or Baghermi was a kingdom and Islamic sultanate southeast of Lake Chad in central Africa. It was founded in either 1480 or 1522 and lasted until 1897, when it became a French protectorate. Its capital was Massenya, north of the Chari River and close to the border to modern Cameroon. The kings wore the title Mbang.

History

The Bagirmi carried a tradition that they migrated from far to the east, which is supported by the resemblance of their language to various tribes on the White Nile. It is not entirely clear when or by whom the Bagirimi kingdom was founded: some king lists trace this event to 1480 when it was supposedly founded by Mbang Abd al-Mahmud Begli, while others deem Mbang Birni Besse responsible, who is said to have founded the kingdom in 1522. He seems to have displaced the earlier Bulala, while he also began to build a palace in Massenya, the capital of the state. The fourth king, Abdullah (1568–1608), adopted Islam and converted the state into a sultanate, permitting the state to extend their authority over many pagan tribes in the area, including the area's Saras, Gaberi, Somrai, Gulla, Nduka, Nuba, and Sokoro. He and his successors continued to use the title "mbang" alongside that of "sultan".

The Shari River formed the kingdom's western boundary, with most of its interior watered by its affluents. The area was home to a kind of footworm that mutilated many of the inhabitants. Bagirmi was also continually plagued by drought, pestilence, and slave raiding both internally and externally organized. During the reign of Idris Alooma, Bornu conquered Bagirmi. The Muslim Bagirmi would raid the pagan tribes of their kingdom to pay the necessary tribute to Bornu. Except for slaves, including eunuchs, Bagirmi also exported animal skins, ivory, and cotton, while importing copper and cowrie shells. Trade with Bornu was carried out by caravans along a route that extended north across the Sahara to Tripoli on the Libyan coast. During the reign of Mbang Muhammad al-Amin (r. 1751–1785) Bagirmi became independent again, although the tributary status remained.

Early in the 19th century, Bagirmi fell into decay and was threatened by the Sultanate of Wadai. It was finally annexed in 1871. It came to European attention following the visits of Dixon Denham (1823), Heinrich Barth (1852), Gustav Nachtigal (1872), and Matteucci and Massari (1881). When Rabih az-Zubayr's forces burned Massenya in 1893, the 25th sultan, Abd ar Rahman Gaourang, moved his government to Chekna. During the Scramble for Africa, the Third French Republic became interested in connecting its possessions across the breadth of Africa, permitting a Dakar–Djibouti railway. Rabih killed Paul Crampel, the leader of the first French expedition through the area but Emile Gentil secured a protectorate over Bagirmi from its sultan in 1897. French ambitions in Sudan were blocked following the Fashoda Crisis the next year, and their authority over the Bagirmi itself was not secured until after the death of Rabih and his sons in 1901. Towns grew up around the French Fort Lamy at the confluence of the Logone and Shari and Fort de Cointet on the middle Shari. The population of the district was reckoned as 100,000 in 1903 and, by the time of the First World War, most of its trade was being conducted with Khartoum in Sudan through the Wadai Empire and with Yola in Nigeria along the Benue.

Legacy
The Baguirmi language is still spoken today, with 44,761 speakers , primarily in the Chari-Baguirmi Region. The empire now exists as an informal entity in the Baguirmi Department, with its capital at Massenya. Its rulers continue to bear the title "Mbang".

See also 
 Rulers of Bagirmi
 History of Chad

Notes

References

Further reading
 
 
 .

2nd millennium in Chad
Muslim empires
Countries in precolonial Africa
History of Central Africa
Sultanates
Bornu Empire
French Equatorial Africa
16th century in Africa
17th century in Africa
Former countries
Former sultanates